Stergios Tsimikas (born 16 February 1994) is a Greek professional footballer who plays as a midfielder for Super League 2 club Apollon Pontus.

Career

Tsimikas started his career with Greek second tier side Panserraikos, where he made over 84 appearances and scored 6 goals and suffered relegation to the Greek third tier. On 3 October 2012, Tsimikas debuted for Panserraikos during a 3–2 win over Kallithea. On 22 May 2013, he scored his first goal for Panserraikos during a 3–0 win over Vyzas Megara.

In 2018, Tsimikas signed for Rochester Super 9 in the American fifth tier. Before the second half of 2018–19, he signed for Greek second tier club Trikala. In 2019, he returned to Panserraikos in the Greek fourth tier, helping them earn promotion to the Greek third tier. Before the second half of 2021–22, Tsimikas signed for Greek second tier team Apollon Pontus.

Personal life

He is the brother of Greece international Kostas Tsimikas.

References

External links

1994 births
Association football midfielders
Expatriate soccer players in the United States
Football League (Greece) players
Gamma Ethniki players
Greek expatriate sportspeople in the United States
Greek expatriate footballers
Greek footballers
Living people
Panserraikos F.C. players
Super League Greece 2 players
Trikala F.C. players
Apollon Pontou FC players
United Premier Soccer League players
Footballers from Thessaloniki